According to Hinduism, the danava Puloman is the father of Shachi, the wife of Indra. Puloman was slain by Indra, who then took his daughter as his consort.

References

Danavas